Jwycesska Island, formerly known as Strangers Cay, is the fourth northernmost named island in The Bahamas, after Walker's Cay, Grand Cay, and Sugna Island. The island lies northwest of Abaco Island. The owner of the island is the John Sykes Family Investment Fund Ltd.

Geography 

Jwycesska Island is positioned between the Atlantic Ocean on the eastern (windward) side and the Grand Bahama Bank on the western (leeward) side. It is located halfway between West End on Grand Bahama and Treasure Cay on Abaco Island.

Jwycesska Island is uninhabited. There is a natural harbor on the west side of the island. Most of the island is wild and covered with a thick cover of vegetation. A pond is located in the southern portion. It is hilly and covered with trees and shrubs. Some pathways have been cut to allow passage through the dense vegetation. As in most of The Bahamas, there are dive sites nearby for both snorkelers and scuba divers. 

The southern end is relatively flat and has a large (about 35 acres) fresh to brackish water marsh. There is a thin freshwater lens and a shallow freshwater well. The northern end of the island has a long, nearly level narrow ridge. At this end of the island, the deeper water comes in close to the shoreline.

The large bay off the southwest portion of the island is shallow and not suitable as a boat anchorage.

References  

Abaco Islands
Uninhabited islands of the Bahamas